The Night Is Ours is the fourth studio album by Australian rock band Youth Group, released in Australia in June 2008 and in the US in April 2009. The album features guest musician Chris Walla of Death Cab for Cutie, who mixed four tracks and also provided additional guitar and backing vocals.

The band recorded the album in a near-derelict 1920s mess hall on Sydney Harbour, which they had rented from the local council at a rate cheap enough to allow them to take their time to develop the songs. Songwriter Toby Martin said the songs were only basic sketches in his head when the group entered the makeshift studio, with the idea being that the whole band would workshop the songs together. "We were very conscious of not losing spontaneity on this album," Martin told the Sunday Herald Sun. "Even though we did a lot of overdubs, we spent a long time on this record because we didn't want to demo the songs first. We wanted to write and arrange the songs in the studio, so recording the album would be capturing the moment of creation rather than capturing the moment of recreation. So we had roughly a week per song—I normally had the lyrics and a bit of a rough idea, or Cameron would have a riff, and by the end of the week we would be putting it down."

The melancholy of the recording venue was reflected in much of the material, which tackled issues such as addiction, grief, desperation and death. Martin commented: "It's a fairly contemplative record, which might have something to do with being by the water, but it also has a slightly creepy or paranoid edge. It's a bit out of the way and there are owls and rats, and old falling down walls, so I think it did influence the record. When I finished recording the record I didn't think it had influenced us much at all, but listening to it later and hearing some of my friends' comments, I was beginning to see how it had rubbed off on to us in a way we hadn't really planned."

Track listing

Singles
 "Two Sides" (April 2008)
 "All This Will Pass" (September 2008)
 "In My Dreams" (December 2008)

Personnel
 Toby Martin – vocals, guitar
 Cameron Emerson-Elliott – guitar
 Patrick Matthews – bass
 Danny Lee Allen – drums

Additional personnel
 Tim Kevin – string and horn arrangements, piano, organ, backing vocals, guitar
 Danny Heifetz – trumpet
 Sam Golding – trumpet, valve trombone, tenor horn
 Ian Pieterse – baritone sax
 Amanda Brown – solo violin
 String trio: Amanda Brown and Jeremy Kong – violin; Sophie Glasson – cello
 Jason Walker – pedal steel guitar
 Johnno Lattin – squeeze box
 Don Lennon – vocals ("What Is a Life?")
 Chris Walla – extra guitar, backing vocals, noises ("Two Sides")

Charts

References

2008 albums
Ivy League Records albums
Youth Group albums